Cladonia is a genus of moss-like lichens in the family Cladoniaceae. They are the primary food source for reindeer/caribou. Cladonia species are of economic importance to reindeer-herders, such as the Sami in Scandinavia or the Nenets in Russia. Antibiotic compounds are extracted from some species to create antibiotic cream. The light green species Cladonia stellaris is used in flower decorations.

Although the phylogeny of the genus Cladonia is still under investigation, two main morphological groups are commonly differentiated by taxonomists: the Cladonia morpho-type and the Cladina morpho-type. The Cladonia morpho-type has many more species, and is generally described as a group of squamulose (grow from squamules), cup-bearing lichens. The Cladina morpho-types are often referred to as forage lichens, mat-forming lichens, or reindeer lichens (due to their importance as caribou winter forage).

Cladonia perforata ("perforate cladonia") is one of two on the U.S. Endangered Species List, and it should never be collected. It exists only in a few small populations in Florida.

Several Cladonia species grow on sand dunes. The presence, and luxuriant carpet-like growth, of Cladonia species is one of the defining characters of grey dune, a priority habitat for conservation under the E.U. Habitats Directive.

Cladonia species are used as food plants by the larvae of some Lepidoptera species including Chionodes continuella.

Selected species

Selected species of Cladonia include:

Gallery

References

Anderson, R. (2009). Cladonia peziziformis (With.) J.R. Laundon (Lecanorales: Cladoniaceae) re-discovered in Co. Down. Ir. Nat. J. 30: 146.

 
Lecanorales genera
Lichen genera
Taxa described in 1756